The Connecticut Huskies women's ice hockey team will represent the University of Connecticut in the 2011–12 NCAA Division I women's ice hockey season. The Huskies will attempt to qualify for the NCAA Frozen Four for the first time in school history.

Offseason
June 9: Huskies head coach Heather Linstad was appointed head coach of the U.S. Women's National Under-18 Team. She will be assisted by Huskies assistant coach Hilary Witt and Minnesota assistant Joel Johnson. Linstad will participate at the USA Hockey Women's National Festival from August 10 to 17. In addition, she will participate in a three-game series versus Canada in Rockland, Ontario (from Aug. 18-21). Her final involvement will involve the 2012 International Ice Hockey Federation World Women's U18 Championship in early January.

Recruiting

Exhibition

Regular season
The Huskies willplay in the Nutmeg Classic on November 25 and 26. 
Nov. 19: Emily Snodgrass scored her first career multi goal game in a 4-2 loss to the Boston College Eagles. With the win, the Huskies snapped a 12-period streak without scoring a goal. The loss tied a program record with six straight losses, dating back to the Huskies first season in 2000-'01.
November 20: The Huskies snapped a six game losing streak with a 3-0 win over Vermont. Goaltender Nicole Paniccia earned her second shutout of the season.
 January 29: The Huskies participated in the annual Hockey East Skating Strides game at the Freitas Ice Forum. Against the Providence Friars, the Huskies were defeated by a 5-2 mark. With the loss, the Huskies fell to 3-18-7 overall. The Huskies ended up being swept in the season series. In a pre-game ceremony, UConn presented Hockey East Associate Commissioner Kathy Winters with a donation of $10,000, representing the Friends of Mel Foundation. Of note, the Huskies set a program-record for funds raised in the Skating Strides event.
February 11: Before the match against the Eagles, Connecticut announced the Connecticut Hockey East All-Decade Team (in commemoration of Hockey East’s 10th Anniversary). The forwards named included: Jennifer Chaisson, Jaclyn Hawkins and Tiffany Owens. The honored defenders included Cristin Allen and Natalie Vibert. Goalie Kaitlyn Shain was named All-Decade goaltender.

Standings

Schedule

Conference record

Awards and honors
Nicole Paniccia, Hockey East Defensive Player of the Week (Week of October 24, 2011)
Emily Snodgrass, Hockey East Rookie of the Week (Week of November 21, 2011)

Hockey East 10th Anniversary Team
 Cristin Allen, selection
 Jaclyn Hawkins, Honorable Mention

References

Connecticut
UConn Huskies women's ice hockey seasons
Connect
Connect